Mary Leonora Carrington  (6 April 191725 May 2011) was a British-born surrealist painter and novelist. She lived most of her adult life in Mexico City and was one of the last surviving participants in the surrealist movement of the 1930s. Carrington was also a founding member of the women's liberation movement in Mexico during the 1970s.

Early life
Mary Leonora Carrington was born at Westwood House in Clayton Green, England, into a Roman Catholic family. Her father, Harold Wylde Carrington, was a wealthy textile manufacturer, and her mother, Marie (née Moorhead), was from Ireland. She had three brothers: Patrick, Gerald, and Arthur. She lived at Crookhey Hall from 1920 until 1927, a large home in Cockerham, which exerted a great influence on her imagination.

Educated by governesses, tutors, and nuns, she was expelled from two schools, including New Hall School in Chelmsford for her rebellious behaviour, until her family sent her to Florence, where she attended Mrs Penrose's Academy of Art. She also, briefly, attended St Mary's convent school in Ascot. In 1927, at the age of ten, she saw her first Surrealist painting in a Left Bank gallery in Paris and later met many Surrealists, including Paul Éluard. Her father opposed her career as an artist, but her mother encouraged her. She returned to England and was presented at Court, but according to her, she brought a copy of Aldous Huxley's Eyeless in Gaza (1936) to read instead. In 1935, she attended the Chelsea School of Art in London for one year, and with the help of her father's friend Serge Chermayeff, she was able to transfer to the Ozenfant Academy of Fine Arts established by the French modernist Amédée Ozenfant in London (1936–38).

She became familiar with Surrealism from a copy of Herbert Read's book, Surrealism (1936), given to her by her mother, but she received little encouragement from her family to forge an artistic career. The Surrealist poet and patron Edward James was the champion of her work in Britain; James bought many of her paintings and arranged a show in 1947 for her work at the Pierre Matisse Gallery in New York. Some works are still hanging at James' former family home, currently West Dean College in West Dean, West Sussex.

Association with Max Ernst
In 1936 Carrington saw the work of the German surrealist Max Ernst at the International Surrealist Exhibition in London and was attracted to the Surrealist artist before she even met him. In 1937 Carrington met Ernst at a party held in London. The artists bonded and returned together to Paris, where Ernst promptly separated from his wife. In 1938 they left Paris and settled in Saint Martin d'Ardèche in southern France. The new couple collaborated and supported each other's artistic development. The two artists created sculptures of guardian animals (Ernst created his birds and Carrington created a plaster horse head) to decorate their home in Saint Martin d'Ardèche. In 1939 Carrington and Ernst painted portraits of each other. Both capture the ambivalence in their relationship, but whereas Ernst's The Triumph of Love features both artists in the composition, Carrington's Portrait of Max Ernst focused solely on Ernst and is laced with heavy symbolisms. The portrait was not her first Surrealist work; between 1937 and 1938 Carrington painted Self-Portrait, also called The Inn of the Dawn Horse, now exhibited at the Metropolitan Museum of Art. Sporting white jodhpurs and a wild mane of hair, Carrington is perched on the edge of a chair in this curious, dreamlike scene, her hand outstretched toward a prancing hyena and her back to a tailless rocking horse flying behind her.

With the outbreak of World War II Ernst, who was German, was arrested by the French authorities for being a "hostile alien". With the intercession of Paul Éluard, and other friends, including the American journalist Varian Fry, he was discharged a few weeks later. Soon after the Nazis invaded France, Ernst was arrested again, this time by the Gestapo, because his art was considered by the Nazis to be "degenerate". He managed to escape and flee to the United States with the help of Peggy Guggenheim, who was a sponsor of the arts.

After Ernst's arrest Carrington was devastated and agreed to go to Spain with a friend, Catherine Yarrow. She stayed with family friends in Madrid until her paralyzing anxiety and delusions led to a psychotic break and she was admitted into an asylum. She was given electroconvulsive therapy and was treated with the drugs Cardiazol (a powerful convulsant), and Luminal (a barbiturate). She was released from the asylum into the care of a keeper, and was told that her parents had decided to send her to a sanatorium in South Africa. En route to South Africa, she stopped in Portugal, where she made her escape. She went to the Mexican Embassy to find Renato Leduc, a poet and Mexican Ambassador. Leduc was a friend of Pablo Picasso (they knew each other from bull fights) and agreed to a marriage of convenience with Carrington so that she would be accorded the immunity given to a diplomat's wife. The pair divorced in 1943. Meanwhile, Ernst had married Peggy Guggenheim in New York in 1941. That marriage ended a few years later. Ernst and Carrington never resumed their relationship.

Mexico

After spending a year in New York, Leduc and Carrington went to Mexico, where many European artists fled in search of asylum, in 1942, which she grew to love and where she lived, on and off, for the rest of her life. 

When Carrington first came to Mexico she was preceded by the success of surrealist exhibitions which allowed her to create many connections within the surrealist movement. Her connections within these surrealist circles were influential in opening artistic doors that had long been closed to Mexican artists. After living in Mexico for seven years, Leonora Carrington held her first solo exhibition at the Galeria Clardecor. Much of the initial response from the public was very encouraging, and the press for months following published positive and approving critic reviews.

After spending part of the 1960s in New York City, Carrington lived and worked in Mexico once again. While in Mexico she was asked, in 1963, to create a mural which she named El Mundo Magico de los Mayas, and which was influenced by folk stories from the region. The mural is now located in the Museo Nacional de Antropología in Mexico City.

In 1973 Carrington designed Mujeres conciencia, a poster for the Women's Liberation movement in Mexico, depicting a 'new Eve'. In the 1970s women artists of previous waves and generations responded to the more liberal climate and movement of the array of feminist waves. Many pushed the issues of women's liberation and consciousness within their work while others spoke out on issues instead of making art. She frequently spoke about women’s “legendary powers” and the need for women to take back “the rights that belonged to them.” Many artists involved in the Surrealism regarded women to be useful as muses but not seen as artists in their own right. Carrington was adopted as a femme-enfant by the Surrealists because of her rebelliousness against her upper-class upbringing.

Carrington primarily focused on psychic freedom in the belief that such freedom cannot be achieved until political freedom is also accomplished. Through these beliefs Carrington understood that "greater cooperation and sharing of knowledge between politically active women in Mexico and North America" was important for emancipation. Carrington's political commitment led to her winning the Lifetime Achievement Award at the Women's Caucus for Art convention in New York in 1986. Throughout the decade women identified and defined an array of relationships to feminist and mainstream concepts and concerns. Continuing through the decade women continued to question the meaning of existence through form and material.

Second marriage and children
She later married Emerico Weisz (nicknamed "Chiki"), born in Hungary in 1911, a photographer and the darkroom manager for Robert Capa during the Spanish Civil War. Together they had two sons: Gabriel, an intellectual and poet, and Pablo, a doctor and Surrealist artist. Chiki Weisz died 17 January 2007, at home. He was 97 years old.

Death
Leonora Carrington died on 25 May 2011, aged 94, in a hospital in Mexico City as a result of complications arising from pneumonia. Her remains were buried at Panteón Inglés (English Cemetery) in Mexico City.

Themes and major works

Carrington stated that: "I painted for myself...I never believed anyone would exhibit or buy my work." She was not interested in the writings of Sigmund Freud, as were other Surrealists in the movement. She instead focused on magical realism and alchemy and used autobiographical detail and symbolism as the subjects of her paintings. Carrington was interested in presenting female sexuality as she experienced it, rather than as that of male surrealists' characterization of female sexuality. Carrington's work of the 1940s is focused on the underlying theme of women's role in the creative process.

Carrington's work is identified and compared with the surrealist movement. Within the surrealist movement, there was a strong exploration of the women's body combined with the mysterious forces of nature. During this time women artists correlated the woman figure with creative nature while using ironic stances.

When painting, she used small brushstroke techniques building up layers in a meticulous manner, creating rich imagery.

In Self-Portrait (1938) Carrington offers her own interpretation of female sexuality by looking toward her own sexual reality rather than theorizing on the subject, as was custom by other Surrealists in the movement. Carrington's move away from the characterization of female sexuality subverted the traditional male role of the Surrealist movement. Self-Portrait (1937–38) also offers insight into Carrington's interest in the "alchemical transformation of matter and her response to the Surrealist cult of desire as a source of creative inspiration." Self Portrait further explores the duality that comes with being a woman. This concept of duality is explored by Carrington using a mirror to assert duality of the self and the self being an observer with being observed. The hyena depicted in Self-Portrait (1937–38) joins both male and female into a whole, metaphoric of the worlds of the night and the dream. The symbol of the hyena is present in many of Carrington's later works, including "La Debutante" in her book of short stories The Oval Lady.

Three years after being released from the asylum and with the encouragement of André Breton, Carrington wrote about her psychotic experience in her memoir Down Below. In this, she explained how she had a nervous breakdown, didn't want to eat, and left Spain. This is where she was imprisoned in an asylum. She illustrates all that was done to her: ruthless institutional therapies, sexual assault, hallucinatory drugs, and unsanitary conditions. It has been suggested that the events of the book should not be taken literally, given Carrington's state at the time of her institutionalization; however, recent authors have sought to examine the details of her institution in order to discredit this theory. She also created art to depict her experience, such as her Portrait of Dr. Morales and Map of Down Below.

Her book The Hearing Trumpet deals with aging and the female body. It follows the story of older women who, in the words of Madeleine Cottenet-Hage in her essay "The Body Subversive: Corporeal Imagery in Carrington, Prassinos and Mansour", seek to destroy the institutions of their imaginative society to usher in a "spirit of sisterhood." The Hearing Trumpet also criticizes the shaming of the nude female body, and it is believed to be one of the first books to tackle the notion of gender identity in the twentieth century. Carrington's views situated motherhood as a key experience to femininity. Carrington stated, "We, women, are animals conditioned by maternity.... For female animals love-making, which is followed by the great drama of the birth of a new animal, pushes us into the depths of the biological cave." While this may seem to differ from certain modern feminist perspectives, the cave, of which Carrington offers many versions, is the setting for a symbolic coming to life, not an actual birth-giving ("and this can mean aquatic or maternal, this can be double, in my opinion"; mère and mer, following Simone de Beauvoir).

Carrington had an interest in animals, myth, and symbolism. This interest became stronger after she moved to Mexico and started a relationship with the émigré Spanish artist Remedios Varo. The two studied alchemy, the kabbalah, and the post-classic Mayan mystical writings, Popol Vuh.

The first important exhibition of her work appeared in 1947 at the Pierre Matisse Gallery in New York City. Carrington was invited to show her work in an international exhibition of Surrealism, where she was the only female English professional painter. She became a celebrity almost overnight. In Mexico, she authored and successfully published several books.

The first major exhibition of her work in UK for twenty years took place at Chichester's Pallant House Gallery, West Sussex, from 17 June to 12 September 2010, and subsequently in Norwich at the Sainsbury Centre for Visual Arts, as part of a season of major international exhibitions called Surreal Friends that celebrated women's role in the Surrealist movement. Her work was exhibited alongside pieces by her close friends, the Spanish painter Remedios Varo (1908–1963) and the Hungarian photographer Kati Horna (1912–2000).

In 2013 Carrington was the subject of a major retrospective at the Irish Museum of Modern Art, Dublin. Titled The Celtic Surrealist, it was curated by Sean Kissane and examined Carrington's Irish background to illuminate many cultural, political and mythological themes present in her work.

Carrington's art often depicts horses, as in her Self-Portrait (Inn of the Dawn Horse) and the painting The Horses of Lord Candlestick. Her fascination with drawing horses began in her childhood. Horses also appear in her writings. In her first published short story, "The House of Fear", Carrington portrays a horse in the role of a psychic guide to a young heroine. In 1935, Carrington's first essay, "Jezzamathatics or Introduction to the Wonderful Process of Painting", was published before her story "The Seventh Horse". Carrington often used codes of words to dictate interpretation in her artwork. "Candlestick" is a code that she commonly used to represent her family, and the word "lord" for her father.

Carrington contributed to the 1973 Mexican horror film The Mansion of Madness directed by Juan López Moctezuma, loosely based on the Edgar Allan Poe short story The System of Doctor Tarr and Professor Fether. She supervised the artistic design for the sets and costumes, with one of her sons, Gabriel Weisz. The repeated appearance of a white horse, Carrington's alter ego, and the elaborate surreal feasts and costumes show her influence and vision.

In 2005 Christie's auctioned Carrington's Juggler (El Juglar), and the realised price was US$713,000, setting a new record for the highest price paid at auction for a living surrealist painter. Carrington painted portraits of the telenovela actor Enrique Álvarez Félix, son of actress María Félix, a friend of Carrington's first husband.

In 2015, Carrington was honoured through a Google Doodle commemorating her 98th birthday. The Doodle was based on her painting, How Doth the Little Crocodile, drawn in surrealist style. The painting was inspired by a poem in Lewis Carroll's Alice's Adventures in Wonderland, and this painting was eventually turned into Cocodrilo located on Paseo de la Reforma.

Legacy and influence
Carrington is credited with feminising surrealism. Her paintings and writing brought a woman’s perspective to what had otherwise been a largely male-dominated artistic movement. Carrington demonstrated that women should be seen as artists in their own right and not to be used as muses by male artists.

The 59th International Art Exhibition will be titled The Milk of Dreams. This name is borrowed from a book by Carrington, in which, as Cecilia Alemani says she, “describes a magical world where life is constantly re-envisioned through the prism of the imagination, and where everyone can change, be transformed, become something and someone else.”

C​arrington’s life inspired "Out of This World: The Surreal Art of Leonora Carrington", a children's nonfiction book written by Michelle Markell and illustrated by Amanda Hall and which tells the story of Carrington’s life and art as she pursues her creative talents and breaks with 20-century conventions about the ways in which an upper-class women and debutants should behave.

Exhibitions
 2023: Leonora Carrington. Revelación, Madrid, Spain, 11 February - 7 May 2023
 2022: Leonora Carrington: El Mundo Magico, Mixografia, Los Angeles, California, 9 July - 27 August 2022
 2020: Fantastic Women, Louisiana Museum of Modern art, Humlebæk, Denmark, 25 July - 8 November 2020
 2019: Surrealism in Mexico - - Exhibitions - Di Donna Galleries, New York, NY, 25 April – 29 June 2019
 2019: Leonora Carrington, The Story of the Last Egg, Gallery Wendi Norris Offsite Exhibition, New York, NY, 23 May – 29 June 2019
 2018: The Leonora Carrington Museum opens in San Luis Potosí, México
 2018: Leonora Carrington. Cuentos Mágicos, Museo de Arte Moderno de la Ciudad de México, Mexico, April – September 2018
 2017: Mad About Surrealism, Museum Boijmans Van Beuningen, Netherlands, Rotterdam
 2017: Surrealist Women, Mayoral, Barcelona, Spain, Barcelona
 2016: Monstruosismos, Museo de Arte Moderno de Ciudad de México, Mexico, Bosque de Chapultepec
 2016: Surreal Encounters. Collecting the Marvellous, Scottish National Gallery of Modern Art, UK, Edinburgh
 2016: Dalí, Ernst, Miró, Magritte ... : Surreal Encounters from the Collections Edward James, Roland Penrose
 2016: Gabrielle Keiller, Ulla and Heiner Pietzsch, Hamburger Kunsthalle, Germany, Hamburg
 2016: Artists and Lovers, Ordovas Gallery, London, UK, Mayfair
 2016: Strange Worlds: The Vision of Angela Carter, Royal West of England Academy, UK, Bristol
 2016: Leonora Carrington: The Last Tuesday Society & Viktor Wynd's Museum of Curiosities, Fine Art & Natural History. Hackney, London, September – December 2016
 2015: Leonora Carrington: Tate Liverpool, 6 March – 31 May 2015
 2015: Surrealism and Magic, Boca Raton Museum of Art, USA, Boca Raton
 2015: Kahlo, Rivera & Mexican Modern Art, NSU Art Museum, Fort Lauderdale, USA, Ft. Lauderdale
 2015: Mexico: Fantastic Identity. 20th Century Masterpieces from the FEMSA Collection, Museum of Latin American Art, USA, Long Beach
 2015: Lorna Otero Project Album of Family, Miami, The Patricia & Phillip Frost Art Museum, Florida International University, USA, Downtown Miami
 2015: Surrealism: The Conjured Life, Museum of Contemporary Art (MCA) Chicago, USA, Near North Side
 2015: Fields of Dream: The Surrealist Landscape, Di Donna, USA, Upper East Side
 2014: Surrealism and Magic, Herbert F. Johnson Museum of Art, Cornell University, USA, Ithaca
 2014: Paper, Pencil & Ink: Prints & Other Works on Paper, Ruiz-Healy Art, USA, San Antonio
 2013: Max Ernst, Fondation Beyeler, Basel, Switzerland, Basel
 2013–2014: Leonora Carrington: The Celtic Surrealist, Irish Museum of Modern Art, Dublin, Ireland (solo)
 2012: In Wonderland: The Surrealist Adventures of Women Artists in Mexico and the United States, Los Angeles
 2012: County Museum of Art, USA, Park La Brea
 2011: Exultation: Sex, Death and Madness in Eight Surrealist Masterworks, Wendi Norris Gallery, USA, Union Square
 2011: The Colour of My Dreams The Surrealist Revolution in Art, Vancouver Art Gallery, Canada, Vancouver
 2011: The Good, The Bad, The Ugly?, Museum of Latin American Art, USA, Long Beach
 2011: Night Scented Stock, Marianne Boesky Gallery, 118 East 64th Street, USA, Upper East Side
 2011: Leonora Carrington & Tilly Losch, Viktor Wynd Fine Art Inc.
 2010: Surreal Friends, Pallant House Gallery, UK, Chichester, and Sainsbury Centre for Visual Arts, UK, Norwich
 2010: Divine Comedy, Sotheby's New York, USA, Upper East Side
 2009: Latitudes: Latin American Masters from the Femsa Collection, The Bowers Museum of Cultural Art, USA, Santa Ana
 2009: Angels of Anarchy: Women Artists and Surrealism, Manchester Art Gallery, UK, Manchester
 2008: Arte Americas The Latin American Art Fair, Tresart, USA, Coral Gables
 2008: Works from the Natasha and Jacques Gelman Collection of Modern Mexican Art, Irish Museum of Modern Art, Ireland, Dublin
 2008: Talismanic Lens, Frey Norris Gallery, San Francisco, CA (solo)
 2007: Surrealism: Dreams on Canvas, Nassau County Museum of Art, Roslyn Harbor, NY
 2003: Frida Kahlo, Diego Rivera and 20th Century Mexican Art: The Jacques and Natasha Gelman Collection, National Museum of Mexican Art, Chicago, IL
 2001–2002: Surrealism: Desire Unbound, The Tate, London, England and The Metropolitan Museum of Art, New York, NY
 1999: Mirror Images: Women, Surrealism and Self-Representation, San Francisco Museum of Modern Art, San Francisco, CA
 1999: Surrealism: Two Private Eyes/The Nesuhi Ertegun and Daniel Filipacchi Collections, Solomon R. Guggenheim Museum, New York, NY
 1993: Regards des Femmes, Musée d'Art Moderne, Lieja, France
 1993: Sujeto-Objeto, Museo Regional de Guanajuato, Guanajuato y Museo de Monterrey, Moneterrey, Mexico
 1991: Galería de Arte del Auropuerto Internacional de la Ciudad de México, Mexico City, Mexico (solo)
 1991: Serpentine Gallery, London, England (solo)
 1991: Sainsbury, Norwich, England (solo)
 1991: Arnolfini, Bristol, England (solo)
 1991: The Mexican Museum, San Francisco, CA (solo)
 1990: Art Company, Leeds, England (solo)
 1990: Brewster Gallery, New York, NY (solo)
 1989: Museo Nacional de la Estampa, INBA, Mexico (solo)
 1987: Brewster Gallery, New York, NY (solo)
 1987: Art Space Mirage, Tokyo, Japan (solo)
 1987: Alexander Iolas Gallery, New York, NY (solo)
 1976: Leonora Carrington : a retrospective exhibition, Center for Inter-American Relations, New York City
 1976: Leonora Carrington : a retrospective exhibition, University Art Museum, University of Texas at Austin
 1970: Impressionism to Surrealism, Worthing Art Gallery, Worthing, England
 1969: The Surrealists, Byron Gallery, New York, NY
 1969: Galerie Pierre, Paris, France (solo)
 1969: Instituto Nacional de Bellas Artes, Sala Nacional, Mexico (solo)
 1969: Palacio de Bellas Artes, Mexico City, Mexico (solo)
 1969: Galería de Arte Mexicano, Mexico City, Mexico (solo)
 1968: Artistas Británicos en México 1800/1968, Instituto Anglo-Mexicano de Cultura, Mexico
 1967: IX Bienal de Pintura, São Paulo, Brazil
 1966: Surrealism: A State of Mind, Universidad de California, Santa Barbara, CA
 1966: Surrealismo y Arte Fantástico en México, Galeria Universitaria, Aristos, Mexico
 1965: Galería Antonio Souza, Mexico City, Mexico (solo)
 1965: Instituto Cultural Anglo-Mexicano, Mexico (solo)
 1965: Galería Clardecor, Mexico City, Mexico (solo)
 1963: Pinturas de la colección de Edward James, Worthing Art Gallery, Worthing, England
 1961: El Retrato Mexicano Contemporáneo, Museo de Arte Moderno, Mexico City, Mexico
 1959: Eros Galerie, Daniel Cordier, Paris, France
 1956: Galería de Arte Mexicano, Mexico City, Mexico (solo)
 1943: Exhibition by 31 Women, the Art of This Century gallery, New York, NY
 1943: First Papers of Surrealism, Madison Avenue Gallery, New York, NY
 1943: 20th Century Portraits, Museum of Modern Art, New York, NY
 1942: Pierre Matisse Gallery, New York, NY (solo)
 1938: Esposition du Surréalisme, Galerie Robert, Amsterdam, The Netherlands
 1938: Exposition Internationale du Surréalisme, Galerie Beaux-Arts, Paris, France

Books
 La Maison de la Peur, H. Parisot, 1938 – with illustrations by Max Ernst
 Down Below (VVV magazine, 1944) - reprinted by Black Swan Press in 1983 and New York Review of Books in 2017
 Une chemise de nuit de flanelle, Libr. Les Pas Perdus, 1951, translated by Yves Bonnefoy, with a cover by Max Ernst
 El Mundo Mágico de Los Mayas, Museo Nacional de Antropología, 1964 – illustrated by Leonora Carrington
 The Oval Lady: Surreal Stories (Capra Press, 1975)
 The Hearing Trumpet (Routledge, 1976); Penguin Books, Limited, 2005, 
 The Stone Door (New York: St. Martin's Press, 1977)
 The Seventh Horse and Other Tales (Dutton, 1988)
 The House of Fear (Trans. K. Talbot and M. Warner. New York: E. P. Dutton, 1988)
The Debutante and Other Stories (Silver Press, 2017)
The Complete Stories of Leonora Carrington (Dorothy, a publishing project, 2017. Introduction by Kathryn Davis)

Artworks
Self-Portrait (Inn of the Dawn Horse), 1936–1937, The Metropolitan Museum of Art, The Pierre and Maria-Gaetana Matisse Collection
The Horses of Lord Candlestick, 1938 (private collection)
The Meal of Lord Candlestick, 1938
Portrait of Max Ernst, c. 1939, Scottish National Gallery of Modern Art
The Temptation of St. Anthony, 1945 (private collection)
The Kitchen Garden on the Eyot, 1946, San Francisco Museum of Modern Art
The Giantess (The Guardian of the Egg), 1947 (private collection)
The Old Maids, 1947, Sainsbury Centre for Visual Arts University of East Anglia
 The Bird Bath, 1974
The Memory Tower, 1995, The Viktor Wynd Museum of Curiosities, Fine Art & Natural History, London
Gatomaquia, 2009, Museo Leonora Carrington, Mexico

See also

 Women Surrealists

References

Further reading
 Chadwick, Whitney. Women Artists and the Surrealist Movement (Thames and Hudson, New York, 1985)
 Sills, Leslie & Whitman. A. "Visions: stories of women artists (Morton Grove, Illinois, 1993)
 Aberth, Susan L. Leonora Carrington: Surrealism, Alchemy and Art (Ashgate/Lund Humphries 2010), 
 Conley, Katharine. Automatic Woman: The Representation of Woman in Surrealism (Lincoln, University of Nebraska Press, 1996)
 Moorhead, Joanna. Another world (article about Carrington), Daily Telegraph (24 April 2010)
 Van Raay, Stefan, Moorhead, Joanna and Arcq, Teresa. "Surreal Friends: Leonora Carrington, Remedios Varo and Kati Horna" (Lund Humphries in association with Pallant House Gallery, 2010)
 Chadwick, Whitney. “Leonora Carrington: Evolution of a Feminist Consciousness”, Woman's Art Journal, Vol. 7, no. 1: (1986. Retrieved 21 February 2012), pg. 38
 Hertz, Erich. "Disruptive Testimonies: The Stakes of Surrealist Experience in Breton and Carrington." Symposium Vol. 64, no. 2: (2010). Academic Search Premier, EBSCOhost (accessed 29 March 2012)
 Aberth, Susan. “Leonora Carrington: The Mexican years, 1943–1985.” Art Journal Vol. 51, no. 3: (Autumn 1992; accessed 1 April 2012) pgs. 83–85
 Elena Poniatowska, Lilus Kikus and Other Stories (1954)
 Alejandro Jodorowsky, The Spiritual Journey of Alejandro Jodorowsky: The Creator of el Topo (Park Street Press 2008), .
 Elena Poniatowska, Leonora (Seix Barral 2011), .
 Tina Kinsella, "We're frightened", On Leonora Carrington, Public Conference, Irish Museum of Modern Art (2013).
 Tina Kinsella, "An Exploration of Animality and Sexual Difference in the Artworks of Frida Kahlo, Leonora Carrington and Bracha L. Ettinger" Animality and Sexual Difference, Public Conference, Dublin City University (March 2014).
 Tina Kinsalla, "Surrealism to Subrealism." Surrealism, Public Conference, Maynooth University, Ireland (10 October 2014).
 Sean Kissane, Leonora Carrington The Celtic Surrealist (DAP 2013), .
 Joanna Moorhead, The Surreal Life of Leonora Carrington (Virago, 2017).
 Gloria Orenstein. "In Memory of the Most Magical Friend I Ever Had: Leonora Carrington," Femspec; Vol. 17, Iss. 1, 2016.
 Nancy Deffebach. "Renaissance Science, Heresy, and Spirituality in the Art of Leonora Carrington." In "Arte y Ciencia: XXIV Coloquio Internacional de Historia del Arte." Mexico City: Universidad Nacional Autónoma de México, 2002.
  (Online version is titled "How Leonora Carrington Feminized Surrealism".)

External links

 Leonora Carrington's Cats
 Leonora Carrington at Wikiart.org
 Leonora Carrington's Surrealist Paintings at disinfo.com
 Dos Surrealistas en México, 15 January 2006
 "Writer Joanna Moorhead goes in search of her long-lost cousin", The Guardian''
 Documents on Leonora Carrington  in the ICAA Documents Project at The Museum of Fine Arts, Houston
 Leonora Carrington biography- The Art History
 The Surreal Life of Leonora Carrington by Joanna Moorhead – review
 Biography and work by Leonora Carrington at Artsy.net
 Self portrait of Leonora Carrington at Met Museum
 Artwork of Leonora Carrington at Wendi Norris Gallery

1917 births
2011 deaths
20th-century English women artists
20th-century Mexican painters
20th-century Mexican novelists
20th-century Mexican women writers
21st-century English women artists
21st-century Mexican painters
Alumni of Chelsea College of Arts
British emigrants to Mexico
British surrealist artists
British surrealist writers
British women's rights activists
English contemporary artists
English women painters
English people of Irish descent
Mexican people of Irish descent
Mexican surrealist writers
Mexican women's rights activists
Mexican women novelists
Mexican women painters
Officers of the Order of the British Empire
People educated at New Hall School
People from Clayton-le-Woods
Women surrealist artists
Weird fiction writers
People from Chorley